Miloslav Hlaváč (1893 – 9 June 1975) was a Czechoslovak sports shooter. He competed in four events at the 1924 Summer Olympics.

References

External links
 

1893 births
1975 deaths
Czechoslovak male sport shooters
Olympic shooters of Czechoslovakia
Shooters at the 1924 Summer Olympics
Place of birth missing